Events in the year 1828 in Norway.

Incumbents
Monarch: Charles III John

Events

Arts and literature

Births
20 March – Henrik Ibsen, playwright (d.1906)
14 April – Johan Lauritz Sundt, industrialist (d.1889).

Full date unknown
Gunleik Jonsson Helland, Hardanger fiddle maker (d.1863)
Bøicke Johan Rulffs Koren, politician and Minister (d.1909)

Deaths
22 June – Lars Ingier, military officer, road manager, land owner and mill owner (b.1760).
15 August – Isaach Isaachsen, politician (b.1774)
2 September – Mathias Bonsak Krogh, bishop and politician (born 4. October 1754)

Full date unknown
Johan Ernst Berg, politician (b.1768)
Christian Krohg, politician and Minister (b.1777)

See also

References